Jon Cor (born November 17, 1984) is a Canadian actor and author, best known for playing Hodge Starkweather in Shadowhunters: The Mortal Instruments, and Brick in Total Drama: Revenge of the Island.

Early life
Cor studied theatre arts at Fanshawe College.

Career
He is known for playing the role of Jake in Beaver Falls, Brick in Total Drama Revenge of the Island, Zach Creed in Being Erica, Jake Byers in The Boy She Met Online, and Hodge Starkweather in the TV series Shadowhunters: The Mortal Instruments.Saw 3D as Ryan.

He appeared in a recurring role in seventh and eighth season of The Flash as Mark Blaine / Chillblaine. In 2023, he’s been promoted to main cast in season nine.

Writing
In 2004, Cor wrote the novel In Heat.

Filmography

Films

TV

References

External links
 Official website
 

1984 births
Living people
21st-century Canadian male actors
Canadian male film actors
Canadian male television actors
Canadian male voice actors
Male actors from Ontario
Writers from Timmins